War of Lies is a 2014 German documentary directed by Matthias Bittner.

Plot 
War of Lies is the story of an Iraqi refugee, whose information about portable weapons of mass destruction passed through the hands of the BND, MI6 and CIA. This information was ultimately used by the US government to legitimize the invasion of Iraq in 2003. Today we know the war was based on a lie.

Awards

References

External links
 

2014 films
German documentary television films
2014 short documentary films
German short documentary films
2010s German-language films
2010s English-language films
2014 multilingual films
German multilingual films
2010s German films